Israel Bar-On (born January 31, 1989) is an Israeli singer, who won Israel's Kokhav Nolad (A Star is Born) song contest in 2008.

Bar-On was born in Beersheba to a religious family. He won the final of Kokhav Nolad 6 contest on August 26, 2008, with 56% of the votes. For the show's finale, he performed an autobiographical song about his new life without parents and religion.

References

1989 births
21st-century Israeli male singers
Jewish Israeli musicians
Musicians from Beersheba
Kokhav Nolad winners
Living people